Portillo de Toledo is a village and municipality in the province of Toledo, Spain. 
In 2001, Portillo de Toledo had 2 055 inhabitants.

References

Towns in Spain
Municipalities in the Province of Toledo